Tamilla Shiraliyeva (born December 8, 1946) is an Azerbaijani actress and ballet master. She was named the People's Artist of the Azerbaijan Soviet Socialist Republic in 1978. Shiraliyeva was also a recipient of the USSR State Prize in 1980 and a Shohrat Order in 2006.

Biography
Shiraliyeva was born on December 8, 1946 in Baku, Azerbaijan SSR. She graduated from the Baku Choreographic College in 1964. She later attended the Moscow State Academy of Choreography in 1968.

Career
Shiralieyeva began her career as a soloist in 1964 for the ballet troupe of the Azerbaijan State Academic Opera and Ballet Theater, performing in several pieces including Ashraf Abbasov's Chernushka and Fikret Amirov's One Thousand and One Nights. She retired from ballet dancing in 1989; she became a teacher and choreographer the following year.

In 2001, Shiralieyeva was the producer-choreographer in the revival of Tofig Bakikhanov's Caspian Ballad at the Azerbaijan State Academic Opera and Ballet Theater, which premiered on November 4, 2001.

She has directed, choreographed, or managed several pieces including Tofig Bakikhanov's Good and Evil, and Joseph Mazilier's Paquita. On July 13, 2007, Shiralieyeva directed in a special showing of Agshin Alizadeh's Tour of the Caucuses to celebrate his 70th birthday. She also choreographed a ballet based upon Niyazi's Rast for the Silk Road Music Festival in July 2014.

Awards
Shiraliyeva was named a Meritorious Artist of the Azerbaijan SSR in 1970. In 1978, she was titled the People's Artist of the Azerbaijan Soviet Socialist Republic. Shiraliyeva also received the USSR State Prize in 1980 for her role as Scheherazade in One Thousand and One Nights.

In 2006, Azerbaijani president Ilham Aliyev thanked Shiraliyeva for her contributions to ballet and awarded her with a Shohrat Order. She also received an honorary diploma from the Baku Choreographic Academy for her work at the academy.

References

1946 births
Azerbaijani ballerinas
Azerbaijani ballet masters
Recipients of the USSR State Prize
Recipients of the Shohrat Order
Dancers from Baku
Living people
People's Artists of the Azerbaijan SSR